William H. Nienhauser Jr. (born 1943) is an American academic, who has been Halls-Bascom Professor of Classical Chinese Literature at the University of Wisconsin-Madison since 1995.

Nienhauser was born in St. Louis, Missouri. He first studied Chinese at the Army Language School (1963–64), and went on to major in Chinese literature at Indiana University and Bonn University (1968–69), receiving his BA (Phi Beta Kappa), MA and Ph.D from Indiana (1966, 1968, and 1973). Although he began working on modern Chinese literature under Professor Liu Wuji 柳無忌 (1907-2002), the year he spent studying Tang literature under Professor Peter Olbricht at Bonn directed him towards working on Liu Zongyuan 柳宗元 (773-819) and Tang fiction. In 1973 Nienhauser edited a volume of essays on Liu published in the Twayne World Author Series and took up a position as assistant professor in the Department of East Asian Languages and Literature at the University of Wisconsin-Madison. In 1979 his P'i Jih-hsiu appeared (Twayne) and in 1985 and 1998 the two volumes of the Indiana Companion to Traditional Chinese Literature. The following year he began to edit what has now become eight volumes translating and commenting on 92 chapters of Sima Qian's Shiji 史記 in cooperation with nearly 70 scholars from the U.S., Germany, China, Japan, Romania, and Italy. The project continues in 2021 with a revised volume 7 just published. Promoted to full professor in 1983, in 1995 he was made Halls-Bascom Professor. In 2020 he retired. Later that year he won the Special Book Award of China as the only American among fifteen international winners for his work on the Shiji.

His publications include the two-volume Indiana Companion to Traditional Chinese Literature and eight volumes of translations from the Shiji (The Grand Scribe’s Records). In 1979 Nienhauser was a founding editor of Chinese Literature: Essays, Articles, Reviews (CLEAR), which he edited until 2009. He has taught or conducted research at several universities in Germany, at Academia Sinica in Taiwan, at Kyoto University, National Taiwan University,  Peking University, and Nanyang Technical University (Singapore). In addition to grants from American Council of Learned Societies, Fulbright-Hays, the German Academic Exchange Service (DAAD), the German Research Foundation, the Alexander von Humboldt Foundation, the Japan Foundation, and the National Endowment for the Humanities, in 2003 he was awarded a Forschungspreis (Research Prize) for lifetime achievement from the Humboldt Foundation.

Works

References

1943 births
Living people
Writers from St. Louis
Indiana University alumni
University of Bonn alumni
University of Wisconsin–Madison faculty